The 2019–20 Liga IV Vaslui was the 52nd season of the Liga IV Vaslui, the fourth tier of the Romanian football league system. The season began on 15 September 2019 and was scheduled to end in June 2020, but was suspended in March because of the COVID-19 pandemic in Romania. Sporting Juniorul Vaslui was declared the county champion and the representative of Vaslui County at the promotion play-off to Liga III.

Competition format
13 teams compete in this season - 9 from previous season, 3 promoted teams from Liga V and one admitted on demand.

The 13 teams will play a regular season, followed by a play-off and play-out. The regular season is a double round-robin tournament. At the end of the regular season the first 8 ranked teams will enter the play-off. The occupants of places 9-12 go into play-out, and the team on the 13th place is relegated directly to Liga V – Vaslui County.

Team changes

To Liga IV Vaslui
Relegated from Liga III
 —

Promoted from Liga V Vaslui
 Crețești
 Viitorul Vetrișoaia
 Negrești

From Liga IV Vaslui
Promoted to Liga III
 Hușana Huși

Relegated to Liga V Vaslui
 Moara Domnească
 Juventus Fălciu

Other changes
 Sporting Bârlad was spared from relegation
 Sporting Juniorul Vaslui was admitted in Liga IV on demand.

League table

Promotion play-off

Champions of Liga IV – Vaslui County face champions of Liga IV – Botoșani County and Liga IV – Bacău County.

Region 1 (North–East)

Group B

See also

Main Leagues
 2019–20 Liga I
 2019–20 Liga II
 2019–20 Liga III
 2019–20 Liga IV

County Leagues (Liga IV series)

 2019–20 Liga IV Alba
 2019–20 Liga IV Arad
 2019–20 Liga IV Argeș
 2019–20 Liga IV Bacău
 2019–20 Liga IV Bihor
 2019–20 Liga IV Bistrița-Năsăud
 2019–20 Liga IV Botoșani
 2019–20 Liga IV Brăila
 2019–20 Liga IV Brașov
 2019–20 Liga IV Bucharest
 2019–20 Liga IV Buzău
 2019–20 Liga IV Călărași
 2019–20 Liga IV Caraș-Severin
 2019–20 Liga IV Cluj
 2019–20 Liga IV Constanța
 2019–20 Liga IV Covasna
 2019–20 Liga IV Dâmbovița
 2019–20 Liga IV Dolj 
 2019–20 Liga IV Galați
 2019–20 Liga IV Giurgiu
 2019–20 Liga IV Gorj
 2019–20 Liga IV Harghita
 2019–20 Liga IV Hunedoara
 2019–20 Liga IV Ialomița
 2019–20 Liga IV Iași
 2019–20 Liga IV Ilfov
 2019–20 Liga IV Maramureș
 2019–20 Liga IV Mehedinți
 2019–20 Liga IV Mureș
 2019–20 Liga IV Neamț
 2019–20 Liga IV Olt
 2019–20 Liga IV Prahova
 2019–20 Liga IV Sălaj
 2019–20 Liga IV Satu Mare
 2019–20 Liga IV Sibiu
 2019–20 Liga IV Suceava
 2019–20 Liga IV Teleorman
 2019–20 Liga IV Timiș
 2019–20 Liga IV Tulcea
 2019–20 Liga IV Vâlcea
 2019–20 Liga IV Vrancea

References

External links
 Official website 

Liga IV seasons
Sport in Vaslui County